Cardiff School of Art & Design (CSAD) is one of the five schools that comprise Cardiff Metropolitan University. It originated as the Cardiff School of Art in 1865.

History
Cardiff School of Art & Design opened in 1865 as the Cardiff School of Science & Art with lessons initially taking place on the top floor of the Cardiff Free Library and Museum. In 1867 a distinct School of Art was formed, based on the Art Night School, with 65 young pupils aged between 9 and 17. In 1868 an older intake was accepted, of 50 'artisan' students between 17 and 25 years old.

In 1966, a new six-story campus was built in Howard Gardens, Cardiff, with large studios facing north. The building was designed by the Cardiff City Architect, John Dryburgh.

The School merged with other colleges in 1976 to become part of South Glamorgan Institute of Higher Education (later Cardiff Institute of Higher Education and the University of Wales Institute Cardiff). It is the oldest constituent part of Cardiff Metropolitan University.

In 2013, Cardiff Metropolitan University put its 2.25 acre Howard Gardens campus up for sale with the intention of moving to a new site in summer 2014. The School now occupies a brand new purpose built building at the university's Llandaff Campus. This new building has extensive purpose built studios and workshops and includes the MIT FabLab, the Perceptual Experience Laboratory, the Schools Foundry and Ceramics facilities as well as its undergraduate, postgraduate and research studios and workshops.

About CSAD 
Cardiff School of Art & Design was assessed as one of the top 40 destinations to study art and design in the UK by guardian.co.uk in 2010.

, CSAD has eleven undergraduate programmes (BA Animation, BSc Architectural Technology, BA Ceramics, BA Fashion Design, BA Fine Art, BA Graphic Communication, BA Illustration, BA Interior Design, BA Photographic Practice, BA/BSc Product Design, BA Textiles and a core ideas, histories and theories subject area called Constellation)

CSAD has eight postgraduate programmes (MRes Art & Design), MA Illustration & Animation, MA Ceramics & Maker, MA Fashion Design, MFA Fine Art, MDes Global Design, MA Creative Innovation & Enterprise and MSc Product Design).

CSAD also offers doctoral research degrees leading to Research Doctorate (PhD) and also Professional Doctorate (DProf) (DEng) (DSBE) and the MRes research training programme.

CSAD has a number of partner colleges who deliver its Art & Design Foundation Diploma, HNCs, Foundation Degrees and a further BA on its behalf as well as close links with Ffotogallery, Cardiff and Cardiff University Medical School. It has research affiliations and study exchange agreements with numerous other UK, EU and International Universities.

CSAD is affiliated with the Association of Commonwealth Universities, European University Association, and University Alliance.

Research
The school's Art and Design research is conducted through the Wales Institute for Research in Art and Design (WIRAD). In the 2008 Research Assessment Exercise the Art & Design panel rated 95% of the research submission as international standard, with 70% rated as either Internationally Excellent or World Leading.

It is home to a number of highly regarded international standard research groups which range across the humanities, art, design and sciences as well as the Centre for Ceramic studies.

Cardiff Open Art School
The Cardiff Open Art School (COAS) is part of the School, and runs classes in photography, ceramics, life drawing, printmaking and several other disciplines for part-time students in the Cardiff area in particular through the School's relationship with FFotogallery and tactileBOSCH, Cardiff.

Awards
In June 2010, the CSAD Summer Degree Show was voted the best in the UK for painting by Artists and Illustrators magazine.

In 2009, CSAD won both a HEIST bronze award and a best publication award at the Association of Commonwealth Universities Annual Marketing and Communications awards.

Global Partnerships

Quality Assurance International (QAI) together with Planet EDU offer a number of awards closely based on the Cardiff School of Art & design curriculum. These awards run up to diploma level in a number of centres across India. The School has exchange partners right across the world as diverse and far afield as Australia, California, Mexico, Reunion, India, South Korea, Egypt and Lebanon as well as Erasmus partners around Europe all of whom offer Cardiff School of Art & Design students opportunities for travel and exchange.

Notable staff
Evan Charlton, head of the Art School from 1938 to 1945
Shirazeh Houshiary, junior fellow 1979-80. Turner Prize nominee in 1994
Anthony Howell, Senior Lecturer in Time Based Studies from 1986 to 1995
Glyn Jones, head of the School of Fine Art from 1972 to 2001. Credited with rescuing the 56 Group Wales
Ceri Richards (1903–1971), head of painting during World War II
Frank Roper (1914–2000), sculpture lecturer, later vice principal, from 1947 to 1973
Terry Setch, senior lecturer in painting 1964 - 2001, later RWA and RA member
Andre Stitt, Fine Art Professor
Norman Toynton, tutor during the 1960s. Abstract painter and Pop artist
Frank Vining (1924–1989), ceramics tutor from 1950 to 1982
Tom Hudson (1922-1997), Director of Studies 1964 -1978 Leading art educationalist and exponent of Basic Design

Notable alumni
:Category:Alumni of Cardiff School of Art and Design
Sadie Allen, painter and textile artist
Iwan Bala, Gold Medal winner at the National Eisteddfod of Wales in 1997
David Emanuel, fashion designer and honorary fellow of Cardiff Metropolitan University
Lizzie Farey, wood artist
Esther Grainger (1912–1990), painter and art teacher
Harry Greene, teacher, actor, TV personality
Leslie Gilbert Illingworth, Chief Cartoonist at Punch magazine
Phil Nicol, winner of the Gold Medal for Fine Art at the 2001 National Eisteddfod
Joan Oxland (1920–2009), painter and art teacher
Lilian Rathmell, painter and fabric artist
Brian Savegar (1932–2007), Oscar winner for Best Art Direction for the 1986 film A Room with a View.
Edwin Seward (1853-1924), prominent architect in Cardiff
Robert Thomas (1926–1999), Welsh sculptor
Sue Williams, painter, awarded the Eisteddfod Gold Medal for Fine Art in 2000
Nathan Wyburn (born 1989), became known for his portraits made from food, appearing on Britain's Got Talent in 2011
Ernest Zobole (1927–1999), painter and art teacher

See also
 Art in Cardiff

References

External links
 Cardiff School of Art & Design Webpage

Education in Cardiff
Art schools in Wales
Educational institutions established in 1865
Cardiff Metropolitan University
Arts in Cardiff
Arts organizations established in 1865
1865 establishments in Wales